This is a list of people elected Fellow of the Royal Society in 1942.

Fellows 

Joshua Harold Burn
Sir Frank Macfarlane Burnet
Malcolm Dixon
Sir Edward Charles Dodds
Arthur Fage
Neil Hamilton Fairley
Philip Hall
Charles Samuel Hanes
George Hugh Henderson
Thomas Percy Hilditch
Edward Hindle
Arthur Holmes
Dudley Maurice Newitt
Sir Clifford Copland Paterson
John Keith Roberts
Herbert Wakefield Banks Skinner
David Thoday
Alexander Robertus Todd, Baron Todd of Trumpington
Sir Arthur Elijah Trueman
Sir Alan Herries Wilson

Foreign members

Alfred Newton Richards
Leopold Ruzicka
Nicholas Ivanovich Vavilov
Ivan Matveevich Vinogradov

Statute 12 

Maurice Pascal Alers Hankey, 1st Baron Hankey of the Chart

1942
1942 in science
1942 in the United Kingdom